"Promises, Promises" was the second hit single for the British new wave group Naked Eyes in 1983. The song went on to become a top-20 hit in the US that October, peaking at number 11 on the Billboard Hot 100 singles chart, albeit after it was re-recorded with some lyrics different from the original UK single. It was their follow up to their earlier hit "Always Something There to Remind Me" by Burt Bacharach and Hal David, which was a top-ten hit in the U.S. in mid-1983. (Although Bacharach and David had also written a song titled "Promises, Promises" for the musical of the same name, the Naked Eyes song was an original song written by the band members, Pete Byrne and Rob Fisher.) Madonna performs background vocals on the Jellybean 7" and 12" mixes of the song. These versions weren't released until 2001 in the compilation album Everything and More.

Personnel 
 Pete Byrne – vocals
 Rob Fisher – keyboards
 Tony Mansfield – guitars
 John Read – bass
 Phil Towner – drums

Chart performance

Weekly charts

Year-end charts

Popular culture
The song appears in the enhanced version of Grand Theft Auto V on the in-game radio station Non-Stop Pop FM.

References

1983 singles
EMI Records singles
EMI America Records singles
Naked Eyes songs
1983 songs
Song recordings produced by Tony Mansfield
Songs written by Rob Fisher (British musician)